Rajahamsam is a 1974 Indian Malayalam-language film, directed by Hariharan and produced by Hari Pothan. The film stars Prem Nazir, Jayabharathi, Srividya and Vidhubala  in the lead roles. This film is remade in Telugu as Indradhanussu with Telugu Superstar Krishna and Sarada and it become huge hit in 1977 by Sankranti movies. The film has musical score by G. Devarajan.

Cast
 
Prem Nazir as  Chandran
Jayabharathi as Radha
Srividya as Sarasu
K. P. A. C. Lalitha 
Adoor Bhasi as Driver Krishnankutty
Sankaradi as Radhas Father
T. R. Omana Nanukuttans Mother
Raghavan as Janardhanan
T. S. Muthaiah as Chandrans Father
Bahadoor as Watcher & Nanukuttans Father 
J. A. R. Anand 
Jameela Malik as Shakunthala
K. P. Ummer as Soman
M. G. Soman as Nanukuttan
Master Raghu  as Rajan
Meena as Chandrans Mother
P. R. Menon
 Thaha 
Paravoor Bharathan as padhmanabhan
Shamsudeen 
Vidhubala as Radha

Soundtrack
The music was composed by G. Devarajan.

References

External links
  

1974 films
1970s Malayalam-language films
Films directed by Hariharan